Diblemma is a fern genus in the sub family Microsoroideae.

References

External links

 Diblemma on www.ars-grin.gov

Polypodiaceae